Theresa Schmid McMahon (April 29, 1878-June 27, 1961) was an American economist, political scientist, author, and activist. She earned her PhD in sociology at the University of Wisconsin. She taught in the Department of Economics at the University of Washington for 26 years.

Publications 

 McMahon, T. S. (1912). Women and economic evolution: Or, The effects of industrial changes upon the status of women. Madison, Wis: publisher not identified.
McMahon, T. S. (1925). Social and economic standards of living. Boston: D.C. Heath and Co.

References 

University of Washington faculty
University of Wisconsin–Madison alumni
1878 births
1961 deaths
20th-century American economists